McCook station was an Atchison, Topeka and Santa Fe Railway station in McCook, Illinois. The station was next to the McCook Junction, where BNSF and Indiana Harbor Belt/CSXT tracks interchange. The station closed in 1971 when Amtrak took over United States passenger rail, although freight service still runs on the double-tracked line. 

This station was in operation until 1982 when it was closed along with GM Yard in Willow Springs, and the employees of both stations were laid off unless they could bump elsewhere.

References

External links

Atchison, Topeka and Santa Fe Railway stations
Former railway stations in Illinois
McCook, Illinois
Railway stations closed in 1971
Railway stations in Cook County, Illinois